Murdoc Faust Niccals (born Murdoc Alphonce Niccals) is the fictional British bassist for the virtual band Gorillaz. He is voiced by Phil Cornwell and was created by Damon Albarn and Jamie Hewlett.

In the Gorillaz universe, Murdoc was responsible for most of the conception and formation of the band, and he is resentful of 2-D being the frontman. He was based on Rolling Stones guitarist Keith Richards. As a Satanist, Murdoc's fictional biography is filled with references to Satanism, such as his birthday being on 6/6/66, and indicates that, to become a famous musician, Murdoc made a deal with the Devil—leading him to change his middle name to Faust—who provided Murdoc with his own bass guitar, El Diablo.

In 2018, it was revealed that Murdoc was incarcerated and did not contribute to the band's sixth album The Now Now, instead, being replaced by the character Ace, the leader of the Gangreen Gang from Cartoon Network's 1998 animated series The Powerpuff Girls. Murdoc has since returned to the band as an active member and is the bass player from Song Machine onwards.

Development

Characterization
Murdoc is based on Rolling Stones guitarist Keith Richards, Victor Frankenstein, and Creeper from Scooby-Doo. In particular, he was inspired by a photograph of the Rolling Stones taken in 1968 by photographer David Bailey. His wardrobe and fashion is inspired by that of Black Sabbath's Ozzy Osbourne. Once described by creator Jamie Hewlett as being the "unpleasant villain of the band", Murdoc is a Satanist who is often depicted wearing an inverted cross necklace, with "Hail Satan" being a common catchphrase of his. He was created by Hewlett and Damon Albarn in 1998, with his first official appearance being Gorillaz' debut EP Tomorrow Comes Today in 2000.

Fictional history
Murdoc was born on 6 June 1966 in Stoke-on-Trent, England to an unknown mother and Sebastian Niccals.

In the Gorillaz backstory, Murdoc's family, his father Sebastian especially, was frequently abusive towards him, and his father often exploited him by forcing him to perform at local pub talent shows against his will for money. His distinct nose shape is said to be the result of frequent physical abuse from family and peers that he was the victim of since his childhood. Murdoc's experiences of abuse as a child have had a significant impact on his psychological state as an adult. As a teenager, Murdoc became interested in Satanism, eventually making a deal with the devil and selling his soul to become a rock star. From this point on, Murdoc's middle name changed from "Alphonce" to "Faust", and Satan gave him his bass guitar, El Diablo, in finalization of the deal.

Murdoc is said to have gone on a crime spree with a gang of criminals in a stolen car on 15 August 1997 and crashed said car through the window of the keyboard shop that a then 19-year-old Stuart Pot was working at, landing on his face directly which gave him hyphema in one eye and put him in a coma. This lead Murdoc to be sentenced to extensive community service and mandatory caretaking of Stuart. Afterwards, while in the car with a comatose Stuart, he caused another car accident, with this one causing Stuart to fly through the windshield and onto the curb, which gave him hyphema in the other eye and caused him to come out of his coma. He was then given the nickname "2-D" by Murdoc and he immediately chose him to be the frontman of a new band he was forming. Soon after, Murdoc would then buy a studio after discovering it on the internet and move into the studio with 2-D, giving it the name Kong Studios. Murdoc would then go on to kidnap drummer Russel Hobbs while he was working at a record store called Big Rick Black's Record Shack in SoHo. Their then guitarist Paula Cracker, who was dating 2-D at the time, had an affair with Murdoc in the bathroom of their studio. She was then kicked out of the band after Russel caught the affair in action and punched Murdoc in the nose, giving it another disfigurement. She was later replaced by a Japanese guitar prodigy named Noodle after she shipped herself to Kong Studios in a FedEx crate in 1998. At this point, Gorillaz was officially formed and ready to launch.

After the success of the band's debut album and its tour, Gorillaz were approached by a movie director who expressed an interest in the production of a potential Gorillaz movie and the band briefly moved to California. Following this, Gorillaz had a meeting in which they all discussed potential concepts for a Gorillaz film. In the middle of the meeting, 2-D and Murdoc had an argument that ended with Murdoc strangling 2-D and Russel punching Murdoc in 2-D's defense. After this event, the band went their separate ways. Murdoc relocated to a brothel in Tijuana, Mexico and was arrested for counterfeit checks. After escaping from prison and returning to Kong, he discovered that bandmate Noodle had rough demos for a second Gorillaz album already written, with Murdoc then contributing his basslines to the album.

After Demon Days success further escalated Gorillaz' status as virtual pop stars, Noodle was presumed dead after the music video for "El Mañana" appeared to show the flying windmill island she was on in the "Feel Good Inc." music video being gunned down by attack helicopters. Soon thereafter, a panicked 2-D and Russel departed from Kong upon discovering this information. After going various places across the world, Murdoc became an arms broker for a group of mercenaries named the Black Clouds to raise money quickly after growing short on income. He subsequently burnt down Kong Studios, committed insurance fraud to save money, and fled from the UK on a boat to an island of floating landfill in Point Nemo that he would later convert into his home. Taking inspiration from Thunderbirds Tracy Island, Murdoc dubbed this island "Plastic Beach", creating a cyborg replica of guitarist Noodle and kidnapping frontman 2-D to begin work on Gorillaz third album Plastic Beach without contributions from Noodle or Russel. After Noodle and Russel eventually arrived on Plastic Beach, the island was later shot down by a group of pirates and the band then parted ways once again.

In the aftermath of Plastic Beach, Gorillaz' 2016 interactive short story "The Book of Murdoc" reveals that Murdoc and Cyborg Noodle were arrested for breach of contract by EMI and then released under the condition that he record a new Gorillaz album, to which he agreed and was reunited with his former bandmates to record Humanz, the band's first album in seven years. At the 2018 Brit Awards, it was revealed that Murdoc was incarcerated at HM Prison Wormwood Scrubs, being absent for the making of Gorillaz' sixth album, The Now Now. He was temporarily replaced by Ace of the Powerpuff Girls at the time, starting an extensive campaign called "Free Murdoc" to have himself freed from prison. He has since been released from prison and returned to the band on 20 September 2018, starring with the rest of Gorillaz in an advertisement campaign called "Mission M101" promoting their line of G-Shock watches and joining them for the final leg of The Now Now Tour.

After going on vacation in Ibiza in 2019, he has since returned to the band as an active member and is the bassist for the band's latest project Song Machine. In the first season of Song Machine, a somewhat confused Murdoc attempts to uncover information about the portals in the band's newly revamped and relocated Kong Studios before building a portal of his own after being left behind by the rest of the band for a trip they made using one of the portals.

In 2022, Gorillaz relocated to Silver Lake, Los Angeles to record their eighth album Cracker Island. During this period, Niccals along with the rest of Gorillaz set up the religious organization The Last Cult, in which he appointed himself leader.

Physical appearance
Murdoc is based on Keith Richards of the Rolling Stones. As such, he has a similar hairstyle and facial features. Murdoc is designed as having distinct sickly green colored skin, and is often illustrated with yellow colored eyes, sometimes being depicted with a red pupil in his right eye. He also has a misshapen nose and sharp, sometimes yellow teeth and a large grin. He has a black mop top that covers a portion of his face and hides his eyebrows. His eyebrows have sometimes been visible in artwork since Humanz in 2017. He has an overbite when his mouth is closed and he has a bright red fingernail on one of his pinky fingers. He and all of Gorillaz' other virtual band members have also gotten older with each Gorillaz release and the wardrobe he is depicted in changes frequently, although less so than the other band members. He is often depicted as shirtless and sometimes even completely naked, and has had several different tattoos displayed on his body throughout the years.

Fashion
As with the rest of the Gorillaz members, Murdoc is regularly depicted in different wardrobe and his clothing changes often, in contrast to most other cartoon characters. Although Murdoc often is frequently designed in different clothing like the other Gorillaz characters are, his wardrobe is generally less varied than the others. He typically tends to stick to wearing a grey or black sweater and grey or blue jeans with cuban heel boots and an inverted cross necklace. He sometimes wears a purple and red cape, especially during the Demon Days era, with the cape returning in Song Machine. In the Plastic Beach era, Murdoc's wardrobe conveyed a nautical theme due to the setting and theme of the album, commonly wearing sea captain suits and a bandana. He is also seen wearing sea captain hats, which he has also worn in The Now Now and Song Machine. In the Humanz era, Murdoc's most frequently worn clothing were torn up two tone striped shirts, and in artwork for The Now Nows "Free Murdoc" campaign, he was mostly depicted in a prison uniform until after his release, where leather jackets, boots and a pair of jeans were being his most commonly worn clothing.

Age
Originally in his mid-30s when Gorillaz was released in 2001, he is now a middle aged man who is entering his mid-50s. Murdoc's jaundice has become more intense over time, with the first significant increase in its intensity occurring in the music video for "Rockit" in 2004. He has also gained a bit of weight and an increase in body hair and muscle. His head and chin have changed shape overtime as well, becoming blockier and more narrow than the more rounded form it took before.

Personality
Murdoc has been frequently depicted as the perpetuator of constant abuse towards Gorillaz bandmate 2-D, although this abuse appears to have stopped in recent years. Murdoc's personality can be defined by pride, depravity, sadism, cynicism, and misanthropy, and he's been shown to be consistently rude and sarcastic towards the people around him. He is perpetually angry and bitter and often takes it out on his peers. Murdoc has an off-color sense of humor and has displayed a tendency towards controversial behavior. In the "G-Bite" short "Fancy Dress", he is shown wearing a Nazi uniform for a photoshoot, and in some old Gorillaz images, his Winnebago has been shown displaying a Confederate flag. He can be very talkative in interviews, and has a habit of going on long tangents and rants. He has a history of being a womanizer, described as being "a rent-a-quote misogynist who speaks without a taste filter", but has since developed into a self-described feminist.

Murdoc has been shown to have an abundance of self-confidence and pride to the point of appearing to be arrogant and conceited, frequently speaking highly of himself and boasting of his accomplishments, even if many of such claims are falsified or exaggerated. He is very self-centered and egotistical, and according to Gorillaz co-creator Damon Albarn, "He really does believe that the world exists entirely for his own pleasure".  Murdoc is also known for telling lies and giving inaccurate accounts of various kinds about himself and the band. He is resentful and jealous, and enjoys being the center of attention. He is a thrill seeker with a tendency to participate in dangerous acts for pure adrenaline. He has been described by Gorillaz co-creator Jamie Hewlett as the band's villain. Albarn once said of Murdoc's personality on a 3VOOR12 interview on 29 October 2020, "He's not redeemable, that's not in his cartoon DNA. He's irredeemable. He's that kind of character, he's a classic cartoon villain[...]He's rotten. He doesn't want to be saved."

Murdoc is a habitual offender criminal and convicted felon who has regularly partaken in various criminal activity since his childhood. In his youth, Murdoc is said to have been a troublemaker and a delinquent with a history of pulling many pranks and exhibiting generally disorderly conduct as a school student, resulting in his expulsion from school at 16. Murdoc and Gorillaz frontman 2-D first met in 1997 while he partook in a crime spree with a gang of criminals. In 2003, Murdoc was sentenced to 30 years of imprisonment in Tijuana, Mexico for giving counterfeit checks to prostitutes, but escaped with the help of two fellow inmates. In Gorillaz' 2016 interactive short story "The Book of Murdoc", it was revealed that Murdoc and Cyborg Noodle had been imprisoned for breach of contract following the events of Plastic Beach before being released under the condition that a new Gorillaz album be recorded. In 2018, he was allegedly incarcerated for what he claims was a false drug smuggling accusation (but ended up being for unpaid parking tickets) and organized a campaign with the goal of setting him free from prison called "Free Murdoc".

Murdoc has been shown as being bisexual since 2004, with Noodle saying in a Q&A session, "Murdoc says that he can pick up boys with chopsticks but he has used his dictaphone. I do not understand this." The music video for "Dare" ends with a nightmare sequence where Murdoc sleeping in the same bed as the song's guest artist Shaun Ryder. In the first of Murdoc's Pirate Radio broadcasts from 2010, he mentions having sexual desires for comedian Ronnie Corbett. In Gorillaz' 2018 campaign "Free Murdoc", Murdoc responds with "my sexual preferences are more complex and terrifying than you can ever imagine" when questioned about his sexuality.

Murdoc has also built a few different contraptions over the years. For Plastic Beach, Murdoc built Cyborg Noodle, an android replica of the Gorillaz guitarist with all of her skills, memories, and personality traits, using a strand of Noodle's hair as a DNA sample to start the process. In the Song Machine episode "Pac-Man", Murdoc builds an Orgone accumulator to use as a portal of his own, and built a modified Pac-Man arcade machine for 2-D to play.

Murdoc's speaking voice, provided by famous British comedian and actor Phil Cornwell, is low, rough, and raspy. Despite being from Stoke-on-Trent, Murdoc speaks in a cockney accent rather than the Potteries dialect commonly associated with the region.

Role in Gorillaz
Murdoc was designed as the bassist and leader of Gorillaz, and is usually portrayed as the main director of the band for most of their albums. Demon Days was mostly written by Noodle, although Murdoc would often try to take all of the credit for it. Murdoc can play other instruments (as can the rest of the characters), but generally leaves them to the other members and sticks to playing bass. One such example of an exception to this is in Plastic Beach, where Murdoc claims to have mainly programmed the drums himself using Gorillaz drummer Russel Hobbs' Hip-hop Machine, as Russel was absent for the recording of Plastic Beach.

Murdoc has occasionally contributed vocals to Gorillaz songs. He claims in the Gorillaz press interview CD "We Are the Dury" that he is the vocalist on the Demon Days track "White Light", and has been portrayed in the fifth installment of his radio show "Pirate Radio" as the robotic voice on the track "Phoner to Arizona" from The Fall. His pet raven Cortez is attributed to the wailing guitar on the Demon Days track "O Green World".

Reception
While DJ Magazine calls Murdoc an "ex-jailbird" who is "quick-witted with a dark streak" and made reference to the contrast that his personality has to frontman 2-D, The Times Magazine podcast host Pete Gulnarick has noted the effect that Murdoc's tragic childhood has had on his life as an adult and Consequence of Sound has made note of Murdoc's villainous nature and devious tricks. Entertainment Weekly has pointed to Murdoc as an example of the impact that the character of Keith Richards had on the music industry.

Other appearances
In 2006, Murdoc made an appearance in an advertisement for telecommunications company Motorola. In the commercial, Murdoc plays a piano naked in the middle of a field of sheep. On 30 July 2006, Murdoc hosted an animated Gorillaz segment in the Season 13 premiere of MTV Cribs, giving a tour of Gorillaz' fictional headquarters at Kong Studios. On 15 November 2010, Murdoc was the host of a tour of Internet Explorer 9 in a seven minute animated short made for the launch of the software. Murdoc and the rest of Gorillaz appear on the back cover of creator Jamie Hewlett's 2017 art book, featured alongside characters from all of Hewlett's projects.

References

Animated characters introduced in 1998
Animated human characters
Animated villains
Fictional alcohol abusers
Fictional bassists
Fictional bisexual males
Fictional characters who have made pacts with devils
Fictional characters with psychiatric disorders
Fictional criminals
Fictional cult leaders
Fictional drug addicts
Fictional English people
Fictional feminists and women's rights activists
Fictional inventors
Fictional prisoners and detainees
Fictional prison escapees
Fictional rock musicians
Fictional Satanists
Fictional thieves
Gorillaz members
Male characters in animation
Male villains
Fictional characters invented for recorded music